Point Lookout Light is an active lighthouse on Point Lookout, a headland on North Stradbroke Island, Queensland, Australia.

History
A proposal for a lighthouse and a signal station on Point Lookout were made as early as 1825. A pilot station was built in 1825 elsewhere on the island, on Amity Point, lighting the South Passage into Moreton Bay. In 1848 this pilot station was also moved.

A lighthouse on Point Lookout was finally constructed in 1932, the first settlement at the point. The light source was a carbide lamp operated by acetylene gas, and a hut for storage of the gas cylinders was built at the close by beach, which was to be named Cylinder Beach for this reason.

Structure and display
The current display is three white flashes every 15 seconds (Fl.(3)W. 15s).

See also

 List of lighthouses in Australia

References

External links

 

Lighthouses completed in 1932
Lighthouses in Queensland
1932 establishments in Australia
Buildings and structures in Redland City